Dorseyville is an unincorporated community in Howard County, Maryland, United States. It is considered part of the modern Glenwood area. The village was situated along a fork in the rolling road that would service Annapolis or Tridelphia, Maryland. A stone dam, named Dorsey's Mill Dam, was situated on the Cattail Creek here before being washed out.

See also
Glenwood, Howard County, Maryland
Roxbury Mill

References

Unincorporated communities in Howard County, Maryland
Unincorporated communities in Maryland